Principles of Guided Missile Design is a textbook and reference book written by E. Arthur Bonney, Maurice J. Zucrow, and Carl W. Besserer in 1956. The book is a glossary of rocket and space flight terms, an introduction to rocket design, parametric studies and student instruction. The book is written in English and was published by Van Nostrand.

References 

1958 non-fiction books